Chiaia- Monte di Dio  is an under construction underground metro station that will serve Line 6 on the Naples Metro.
The station, designed by the architect Hubert Siola, will serve a wide area around the hill Pizzafalcone, on the border between the districts Chiaia and San Ferdinando. The surroundings of the station are rich in sites of interest, both from the point of view of art as the Piazza del Plebiscito, Palazzo Reale and the Galleria Umberto I, the San Carlo theater and Politeama, the lookout of Mount Echia, both from the administrative point of view as 1 Municipality of the City of Naples and the Prefecture, and the shopping streets like via Chiaia, via dei Mille and via Toledo.

The previous station is Municipio, the next is San Pasquale

See also
Railway stations in Italy
List of Naples metro stations

Proposed Naples Metro stations
Railway stations in Italy opened in the 21st century